Kubadin is a village in Sredets Municipality, in Burgas Province, in southeastern Bulgaria.

Kubadin Point on Smith Island, Antarctica is named after the village.

References

Villages in Burgas Province